California's 41st congressional district is a congressional district in Riverside County, in the U.S. state of California.

It includes the cities of Palm Springs, Menifee, Calimesa, Norco, Lake Elsinore, Wildomar, Rancho Mirage, Palm Desert, Indian Wells, La Quinta, and most of Corona. The representative for the 41st is Ken Calvert, who was redistricted from the 42nd district. It contains most of the western part of the Coachella Valley with the exception of Cathedral City, as well as commuter towns in the Greater Los Angeles area. 

Despite containing the heavily Democratic city of Palm Springs, the inclusion of conservative areas in western Riverside County, such as Corona, Norco, Lake Elsinore, Menifee, and Calimesa, make the district a Republican-leaning swing district.

Competitiveness

In statewide races

Composition

As of the 2020 redistricting, California's 41st congressional district is located in the Inland Empire in Southern California. It is located entirely in western Riverside County.

Riverside County is split between this district, the 25th district, the 39th district, and the 48th district. The 41st and 25th are partitioned by Terwillinger Rd, Bailey Rd, Candelaria, Elder Creek Rd, Bonny Ln, Tule Peak Rd, Eastgate Trail, Goldrush Rd, Rule Valley Rd, Laura Ln, Dove Dr, Lago Grande, Barbara Trail, Valley Dr, Foolish Pleasure Rd, Highway 371, Gelding Way, Puckit Dr, Indian Rd, Wellman Rd, El Toro Rd, Burnt Valley Rd, Cahuilla Rd, Highway 74, Bull Canyon Rd, Santa Rosa-San Jacinto Mountains National Monument, Fred Waring Dr, Washington St, Highway 10, Davall Dr, Dinah Shore Dr, Plumley Rd, Gerald Ford Dr, E Ramon Rd, San Luis Rey Dr, San Joaquin Dr, Clubhouse View Dr, Mount San Jacinto State Park, Azalea Creek, Black Mountain Trail, Highway 243, North Fork San Jacinto River, Stetson Ave, Hemet St, Cornell St, Girard St, E Newport Rd, Domenigoni Parkway, Leon Rd, Grand Ave, State Highway 74, California Ave, W Devonshire Ave, Warren Rd, Ramona Expressway, San Jacinto River, Highway 79, Oak Valley Parkway, Champions Dr, Union St, Brookside Ave.

The 41st and 39th are partitioned by Corona Freeway, River Trails Park, Redley Substation Rd, Arlington Ave, Alhambra Ave, Golden Ave, Doheny Blvd, Bolivar St, Campbell Ave, Pierce St, Quantico Dr, Collett Ave, Buchanan St, Highway 91, 12397 Doherty Way-Magnolia Ave, BNSF Railroad, N McKinley St, N Temescal St, E 16th St, S Neece St, Indiana Ave, Skyridge Dr, Fillmore St, 2969 Fillmore St-La Sierra Ave, Cleveland Ave, McAllister Parkway, Corsica Ave, Hermosa Dr, John F. Kennedy Dr, Wood Rd, Colt St, Dauchy Ave, Van Buren Blvd, Bobbit Ave, Chicago Ave, Krameria Ave, 16510 Sendero del Charro-Mariposa Ave, Barton St, Cole Ave, Rider St, Greenwood Ave, Kabian Park, Goetz Park, Ethanac Rd, McLaughlin Rd, Sherman Rd, Tumble Rd, Watson Rd, Escondido Expressway, Mapes Rd, Ellis Ave, Antelope Rd, Rico Ave, San Jacinto River, Ramona Expressway, Lake Perris State Recreation Area, Gilman Springs Rd, Moreno Valley Freeway, Quincy St, Cloud Haven Dr, Holly Ct, Reche Vista Dr, Reche Canyon Rd, and Keissel Rd.

The 41st and 48th are partitioned by Ortega Highway, Tenaja Truck Trail, NF-7506, Tenaja, San Mateo Creek, Los Alamos Rd, Und 233, S Main Dv, Wildomar, Grand Ave, Rancho Mirlo Dr, Copper Canyon Park, 42174 Kimberly Way-35817 Darcy Pl, Escondido Expressway, Scott Rd, 33477 Little Reb Pl-33516 Pittman Ln, Keller Rd, Menifee Rd, Clinton Keith Rd, Max Gilliss Blvd, Highway 79, Borel Rd, Lake Skinner, Warren Rd, Summitville St, Indian Knoll Rd, E Benton Rd, Rancho California Rd, Overhill Rd, Green Meadow Rd, Crossover Rd, Exa-Ely Rd, Denise Rd, Wiley Rd, Powerline Rd, Wilson Valley Rd, Wilson Creek, Reed Valley Rd, Centennial St, Beaver Ave, and Lake Vista Dr. The 41st district takes in the cities of Wildomar, Canyon Lake, Menifee, Palm Springs, Palm Desert, La Quinta, Lake Elsinore, Norco, and Corona, as well as the census-designated places Cherry Valley, Nuevo, Homeland, Sage, Idyllwild-Pine Cove, and Woodcrest.

Cities & CDP with 10,000 or more people
 Corona - 157,136
 Menifee - 102,527
 Lake Elsinore - 70,265
 Palm Desert - 53,275
 Palm Springs - 44,575
 La Quinta - 41,748
 Wildomar - 36,875
 Norco - 26,316
 Woodcrest - 14,347
 Canyon Lake - 11,082

2,500-10,000 people
 Calimesa - 7,879
 Nuevo - 6,447
 Cherry Valley - 6,362
 Homeland - 5,969
 Sage - 3,370
 Anza - 3,075
 Idyllwild-Pine Cove - 2,963

List of members representing the district

Election results

1972

1974

1976

1978

1980

1982

1984

1986

1988

1990

1992

1994

1996

1998

2000

2002

2004

2006

2008

2010

2012

2014

2016

2018

2020

2022

Historical district boundaries

San Diego County
In the 1980s, the 41st congressional district was one of four that divided San Diego County, formerly located in the North County region. The district had been held for 12 years by Republican Bill Lowery and was considered the most Republican district in the San Diego area. The 41st district was renumbered as the  after the 1990 U.S. Census in which it became the Inland Empire's 51st.

San Bernardino County
From 2003 to 2013, the district included large portions of the cavernous San Bernardino County and a small portion of Riverside County. The district formerly represented parts of the Inland Empire region, San Bernardino Mountains, and Mojave Desert, stretching from portions of the city of San Bernardino north to the Nevada border and east to the Colorado River.  Redlands was the largest city in that district; other cities included: Loma Linda, Yucaipa, Victorville, Barstow, Hesperia, Highland, Big Bear Lake and Needles.

See also
List of United States congressional districts

References

External links
GovTrack.us: California's 41st congressional district
RAND California Election Returns: District Definitions
California Voter Foundation map - CD41

41
Congressional 41
Government in Riverside, California
Moreno Valley, California
Perris, California
Constituencies established in 1973
1973 establishments in California